Erwin García (born 13 September 1949) is a Nicaraguan judoka. He competed in the men's half-middleweight event at the 1972 Summer Olympics.

References

1949 births
Living people
Nicaraguan male judoka
Olympic judoka of Nicaragua
Judoka at the 1972 Summer Olympics
Place of birth missing (living people)